The 2014 Eurocup Finals were the concluding two games of the 2013–14 Eurocup season, the 11th season of Europe's second tier basketball league.

Route to the finals
Note: In all results below, the score of the finalist is given first (H: home; A: away).
The two teams met in the Last 32 phase already, as they both advance from Group O. UNICS won both games over Valencia, winning 82–75 at home and 73–76 away.

Game 1

Game 2

Most Valuable Player
Valencia's Justin Doellman was named the EuroCup Finals MVP, after averaging 27 points and 5.5 rebounds in the series.

References

2013–14
2013–14 Eurocup Basketball
2013–14 in Spanish basketball
2013–14 in Russian basketball
International basketball competitions hosted by Spain
International basketball competitions hosted by Russia